Paramios is one of six parishes in Vegadeo, a municipality within the province and autonomous community of Asturias, in northern Spain. 

Villages
 A Barranca
 A Espía
 Monticelo
 Paramios
 Restrepo
 Vijande (Vixande)

References

Parishes in Vegadeo